, also known as Japanese Manners, is a studio album by Japanese singer-songwriter Ringo Sheena and conductor and violinist Neko Saitō, released on February 21, 2007. The vinyl record version and the DVD "Daiginjou" were released on April 25, 2007. This album serves as the soundtrack for the movie .

Background 
Ringo Sheena initially intended to create a highly produced, computer-based sound for the soundtrack and went as far as to record some instrumental demos. However, director Mika Ninagawa demanded songs with lyrics, so she decided to record orchestrated versions using Neko Saitō's arrangements, which he had previously written for her concerts. Though she originally intended to make this album with Tokyo Jihen, drummer Toshiki Hata broke his leg and thus only the other band members were able to participate. Ukigumo played guitar on "Gamble" and wrote "Oiran", while Ichiyō Izawa played piano on "Gamble" and Seiji Kameda arranged "Yokushitsu".

The song "Karisome Otome (Tameikesannoh Ver.)" was recorded in September 2006.

Track listing
All tracks written by Ringo Sheena and arranged by Neko Saitō, except where noted.



Notes:
"Papaya Mango" is a cover of Rosemary Clooney's 1957 single "Mangos."
"Scars" is a cover of Tokyo Jihen's "A Scar of Dreams" (Yume no Ato).

Credits and personnel 
Song
Ringo Sheena (#1-14)
Shiina Junpei (#13)

Conductor
Neko Saitō

Orchestras
  (#1)
  (#2, 6, 9)
  (#3)
  (#4, 11)
  (#5, 7, 8, 12)
  (#10)
  (#13)
 Ringo Sheena×SOIL&"PIMP"SESSIONS (#14)

Violin
Neko Saitō (#8)

Electric guitar
Ukigumo (#1)

Piano
Izawa Ichiyou (#1)

Drum machine
Ringo Sheena (#4, 11)
Nobuhiko Nakayama (#7)

Heisei Fūzoku Daiginjō 
, (English title: Japanese Manners Premium) is a video DVD album by Ringo Sheena and Neko Saitō released on April 25, 2007 by Toshiba EMI / Virgin Music.

Every song from the album Heisei Fūzoku has animated graphics by spirited designers that were inspired by the album's songs.

Track listing

Notes

References

External links 
 Jrawk review

Ringo Sheena albums
2007 albums